Emiliano Ramon Diaz (born 22 June 1982) is an Italian-born retired footballer. He has worked with his father, Ramon Diaz, at Al-Hilal FC between the years of 2016 and 2018, when all the coaching team was sacked due to unsatisfactory performances. He holds Argentine citizenship.

Career
Díaz was born in Naples, the Italian city where his father, the former footballer and Argentine coach Ramón Díaz, was playing (with S.S.C. Napoli). He played in the lower division of Monaco and Yokohama. He played in the first team of Avellino in Italy in 2001 but never made his debut.

In 2002 when his father was the coach he made his debut for River Plate during a game against Rosario Central on May 19, 2002, as a substitute for Eduardo Coudet. He was transferred to Talleres de Cordoba where he almost did not play. In 2004, he moved to Deportivo Colonia in Uruguay. In 2005, he played seven times for the English club Oxford United in Football League Two, after his father was appointed manager. He came back to Argentina to play for Defensa y Justicia and Platense.
In 2007, he transferred to San Lorenzo de Almagro.

Between 2009 and 2010 he played for All Boys, before retiring at the age of 28.

References

External links
 Emiliano Diaz Interview
 En Una Baldosa Profile

Emiliano Díaz at Footballdatabase

Living people
Footballers from Naples
Italian sportspeople of Argentine descent
Citizens of Argentina through descent
Argentine footballers
Argentine Primera División players
1983 births
Association football midfielders
Botafogo de Futebol e Regatas managers
Argentine expatriate sportspeople in Brazil
Expatriate football managers in Brazil